Margrave Conrad I of Brandenburg ( – 1304) was a member of the House of Ascania and a co-ruler of Brandenburg.

Life 
Conrad I was the fourth of six children of Margrave John I of Brandenburg and his wife Sophia, daughter of King Valdemar II of Denmark. He was 26 years old when, in 1266, his father died and he and his elder brothers John II and Otto IV became co-rulers of Brandenburg.  

Conrad went on to rule in the newly acquired Neumark part of Brandenburg east of the Oder River, though he rarely appeared on the political scene. On one occasion, he assisted his brother Otto IV, when they allied with Duke Mestwin II of Pomerelia according to the 1269 Treaty of Arnswalde, occupying the Pomerelian city of Gdańsk and gaining the Pomeranian territory around Rügenwalde.

He died in 1304 and was buried beside his wife in Chorin Abbey. There is an entry in the register at Chorin as follows:

Marriage and issue 
Conrad was married to Constance of Poznań (d. 1281), daughter of the Piast duke Przemysł I of Greater Poland. Together they had four children:
 John IV ( – 1305)
 Otto VII (d. 1308), Knight Templar
 Waldemar ( – 14 August 1319 in Bärwalde)
 Agnes (d. 1329) married in 1300 with Prince Albert I of Anhalt-Zerbst (d. 1316)

Ancestors

References 
 Andreas Thiele: Erzählende genealogische Stammtafeln zur europäischen Geschichte. Deutsche Kaiser-, Königs-, Herzogs- und Grafenhäuser, vol I, part 1, table 223

External links 
 Entry in the database of the University of Erlangen

Footnotes

House of Ascania
Margraves of Brandenburg-Stendal
1240 births
1304 deaths
13th-century German nobility
Year of birth uncertain
Place of death unknown